Mount Tabor is an unincorporated community in Adams County, Pennsylvania, United States.

References

Unincorporated communities in Pennsylvania
Unincorporated communities in Adams County, Pennsylvania